Siamusotima is a genus of moths of the family Crambidae. The genus was erected by Maria Alma Solis et al. in 2005.

Species
Siamusotima aranea Solis, Yen, Goolsby, Wright, Pemberton, Winotal, Chattrukul, Thagong & Rimbut, 2005
Siamusotima disrupta Solis, Pratt, Makinson, Zonneveld & Lake, 2017

References

Musotiminae
Crambidae genera